Rafi (also Romanized as Rafī‘) is a village in Nasar Rural District, Arvandkenar District, Abadan County, Khuzestan Province, Iran. At the 2006 census, its population was 193, in 40 families.

References 

Populated places in Abadan County